The Mamakan is a river in Irkutsk Oblast, southern East Siberia, Russia. It is a tributary of the Vitim of the Lena basin. There are no settlements by the river, only Mamakan near its mouth by the Vitim. 

Course
The Mamakan is a left tributary of the Vitim. Its sources are in the Northern Muya Range, a subrange of the Stanovoy Highlands, at the northeastern limit of the Upper Angara Range. In its upper course it is known as the Sredny Mamakan (Middle Mamakan). The river flows roughly in a northwestward direction and is joined by the Left Mamakan and the Right Mamakan. It cuts across the Delyun-Uran Range (Делюн-Уранский хребет) and flows northwards. Finally near the Mamakan settlement it meets the Vitim  from its mouth in the Lena. 

The tributaries of the Mamakan are the Telmama, Tamarak, Right Mamakan, Kaalu and Sira from the right, and the Mamachek, Dodykta, Ikibzyak, Bugorikhta, Left Mamakan and Dylgdaisi from the left. The river is frozen between October and May.

See also
List of rivers of Russia

References

External links

Rivers of Irkutsk Oblast
Stanovoy Highlands